The Overland Monthly was a monthly literary and cultural magazine, based in California, United States. It was founded in 1868 and published between the second half of the 19th century and the first half of the 20th century.

History

The Overland Monthly was founded in 1868 by Anton Roman, a Bavarian-born bookseller who moved to California during the Gold Rush. He had recently published the poems of Charles Warren Stoddard and a collection of verse by California writers called Outcroppings. The magazine's first issue was published in July 1868, edited by Bret Harte in San Francisco, and continued until late 1875. Roman, who hoped his magazine would "help the material development of this Coast", was originally concerned that Harte would "lean too much toward the purely literary". Harte, in turn, was skeptical at first that there would be enough quality content provided from local authors. The first issue included contributions from the "Golden State Trinity": Harte, Stoddard, and Ina Coolbrith.

Despite the positive response from critics and the magazine's profitability, publisher Anton Roman sold the Overland Monthly in June 1869 for $7,500 to John Carmany. Harte immediately offered the new owner a list of demands, including a raise to $200 a month and a guarantee of his complete editorial control of each issue. Carmany agreed to his terms, and Harte was able to leave his job at the San Francisco Mint to devote his full attention to the Overland Monthly. The publication continued to thrive in this period; Mark Twain reported that he had "heard it handsomely praised by some of the most ponderous of America's literary chiefs."

In the September 1870 issue, Harte published what became his most well-known work, "Plain Language from Truthful James", later known as "The Heathen Chinee". That year, with his popularity soaring, Harte considered a professorship at the University of California, Berkeley or an offer to purchase the Overland Monthly, but declined both. Instead, he left California and traveled east to seek broader literary fame.

The original publishers, in 1880, started The Californian, which became The Californian and Overland Monthly in October 1882. In January 1883, the effort reverted to The Overland Monthly (starting again with Volume I, number 1). The 1884 volume contained a commitment to present content "free of advertising taint," explaining that no article would appear that was not "in good faith what it appears to be." It was based in San Francisco until at least 1921. In 1923 the magazine merged with Out West to become Overland Monthly and the Out West magazine, and ended publication in July 1935.

Contributors

Noted writers, editors, and artists associated with the magazine included:
 Robert Ingersoll Aitken
 Ambrose Bierce
 Noah Brooks
 Alice Cary
 Willa Cather
 Charles W. Chesnutt
 Frona Eunice Wait Colburn
 Bret Harte
 Ina Coolbrith
 Edgar Fawcett
 Henry George
 John Brayshaw Kaye
 Charmian Kittredge
 Netta Eames
 Clarence King
 Kinahan Cornwallis
 Jack London
 Josephine Clifford McCracken
 Joaquin Miller
 John Muir
 Hugo Wilhelm Arthur Nahl
 Lola Ridge
 Charles Taze Russell
 Stephen Powers
 William Saroyan
 Herman George Scheffauer
Charles Howard Shinn
Milicent Shinn
 Clark Ashton Smith
 Josephine Spencer
 Charles Warren Stoddard
 Augustus Gabriel de Vivier Tassin
 Douglas Tilden
 Mark Twain
 Frances Fuller Victor
 Laura Lyon White
 Joseph Widney
Editors include:
 Milicent Shinn 1883-1894 
Rounsevelle Wildman, editor 1894-1897

References

External links

 Archive 1868-1900: University of Michigan, Making of America Journals collection online
 More issues, into the 1900s: Archive.org
 Persistent Serial Archives at The Online Books Page, University of Pennsylvania
 Guide to the Overland Monthly Records, at The Bancroft Library
 Overland Monthly from Encyclopedia.com

Monthly magazines published in the United States
Magazines published in San Francisco
Defunct literary magazines published in the United States
History of California
History of the American West
Magazines established in 1868
Magazines disestablished in 1923